Chhotalal Rukhdev Sharma (died 1926) was a Gujarati playwright.

Biography
He had studied Sanskrit in childhood and had studied Raghuvansh by Kalidas. His first play Madhav Vilas (1899) was produced by Amdavad Gujarati Natak Company. He had a long career with Deshi Natak Samaj. He used unconventional Savaiya, Shikharini and Totak metres in musical plays instead of popular Betabaji metre. He wanted to start his own theatre company so he had consulted poet Fulchandbhai Shah to write Rajhans based on Dashakumaracharitra but he died soon in 1926.

Works
His plays are as follows:

See also
 List of Gujarati-language writers

References 

Gujarati-language writers
Gujarati people
1926 deaths
Indian male poets
20th-century Indian male writers
Dramatists and playwrights from Gujarat
Gujarati theatre
Date of birth missing
20th-century Indian dramatists and playwrights